The 1948 Green Bay Packers season was their 30th season overall and their 28th season in the National Football League. The team finished with a 3–9 record under coach Curly Lambeau, earning a fourth-place finish in the Western Conference.

Offseason

NFL draft

Regular season

Schedule

Standings

Roster

Awards, records, and honors

References

 Sportsencyclopedia.com

Green Bay Packers seasons
Green Bay Packers
Green